Interleukin 20 receptor, alpha subunit, is a subunit of the interleukin-20 receptor, the interleukin-26 receptor, and the interleukin-24 receptor. The interleukin 20 receptor, alpha subunit is also referred to as IL20R1 or IL20RA. The IL20RA receptor is involved in both pro-inflammatory and anti-inflammatory responses, signaling through the JAK-STAT pathway.

IL20RA is found in the skin, lungs, ovaries, testes and placenta, with low gene expression in the intestine and liver. IL20RB is found in many organ resident effector cells such as keratinocytes at the skin epidermis, osteoclasts, found in bones, and epithelial cells of the intestine and trachea. IL20RA is also found in some immune cells.

Structure and function 
IL20RA is an alpha-chain with a long intracellular domain. IL20RA, along with the IL-20 receptor, beta subunit, form the heterodimeric interleukin-20 receptor, which binds the cytokines IL-19, IL-20 and IL-24. IL20RA also forms a complex with the IL-10 receptor, beta subunit, which binds the cytokine IL-26.

Signaling 
Receptors made up of IL20RA signal through a JAK-STAT signaling pathway. In this pathway, after a cytokine binds IL20RA and the beta subunit, JAKs linked to intracellular domains of IL20R activate and phosphorylate tyrosine residues found in the longer alpha chains of IL20RA. STAT then binds to docking sites created by JAK phosphorylation and becomes phosphorylated by JAK. STATs then dimerize and move to the nucleus to act as transcription factors. The specific genes expressed are dependent on the specific JAK, STAT, as well as by SOCS proteins, which can inhibit the JAK-STAT signal, regulating it.where the transcription factor STAT3 binds to IL20RA and STAT3 becomes activated.[1] IL20RA has multiple docking sites for STAT3.

Link to Immune System and Disease 
Research indicates that IL20RA is found in some immune cells. For example, IL20RA is sometimes found in lung macrophages. Research indicates that IL20RA presence may be related to disease. In people with rheumatoid arthiritis, IL20RA is present in blood monocytes.

IL20RA has also been linked with psoriasis, and atherosclerosis, all diseases associated with inflammation. The specific role of IL20RA in these diseases is unkown.

References

Further reading

Type II cytokine receptors